Rhododendron phaeochrysum (栎叶杜鹃) is a species of flowering plant in the family Ericaceae. The flowers are white to pale pink, with purplish  spots.

References

Sources
 "Rhododendron phaeochrysum", I. B. Balfour & W. W. Smith, Notes Roy. Bot. Gard. Edinburgh. 10: 131. 1917.

phaeochrysum
Taxa named by Isaac Bayley Balfour
Taxa named by William Wright Smith